Afranius Syagrius ( 345–382) was a Roman politician and administrator.

Life 
Afranius was a member of the Roman aristocratic family of the Syagrii, which originated in Lyon. In the same years in which Afranius lived, another Syagrius is attested (he was consul in 381), and it is not always possible to distinguish the career of the two Syagrii.

In 369, Afranius is attested as notarius. In that year, the Roman Emperor Valentinian I removed him from his office after a failed military operation, and Afranius dedicated himself to private life.

He continued his career under Emperor Gratian, possibly because of his friendship with the poet Ausonius. Afranius was magister memoriae in 379, when someone named Theodorus succeeded him. Between June 18, 380, and August of 382 he is attested as Praetorian prefect of Italy. In 381 he was also praefectus urbi of Rome and Consul in 382.

See also
 Afrania gens
 Tonantius Ferreolus (prefect), maternal grandson

Notes

Citations

References
 CLRE – 
 PLRE 1 – 
Potter, David Stone, The Roman Empire at Bay: Ad 180-395, Routledge, 2004, pp. 545–546.

4th-century Romans
4th-century Roman consuls
Syagrius
Imperial Roman consuls
Praetorian prefects of Italy
Urban prefects of Rome
Year of death unknown
Year of birth unknown